Oscaecilia elongata is a species of caecilian in the family Caeciliidae. It is endemic to Panama. Its natural habitats are subtropical or tropical moist lowland forests, plantations, rural gardens, and heavily degraded former forest.

References

Oscaecilia
Amphibians described in 1942
Taxonomy articles created by Polbot